Blast Radius is a space combat simulator video game developed and published by Psygnosis for the PlayStation in 1998-1999.

Reception

The game received mixed reviews according to the review aggregation website GameRankings. Next Generation said, "It doesn't matter how much of a space-fighter fan you are, Blast Radius is just plain bad."

Notes

References

External links

1998 video games
PlayStation (console) games
PlayStation (console)-only games
Psygnosis games
Space combat simulators
Video games scored by Alastair Lindsay
Video games developed in the United Kingdom